Bosara minima is a moth in the family Geometridae. It is found in Queensland, New Guinea, the Bismarck Archipelago and the Solomon Islands.

References

Moths described in 1897
Eupitheciini